New Tai Lue script, also known as Xishuangbanna Dai and Simplified Tai Lue, is an abugida used to write the Tai Lü language. Developed in China in the 1950s, New Tai Lue is based on the traditional Tai Tham alphabet developed . The government of China promoted the alphabet for use as a replacement for the older script; teaching the script was not mandatory, however, and as a result many are illiterate in New Tai Lue. In addition, communities in Burma, Laos, Thailand and Vietnam still use the Tai Tham alphabet.

Consonants

Initials
Similar to the Thai and Lao scripts, consonants come in pairs to denote two tonal registers (high and low).

Finals
Final consonants do not have an inherent /a/ vowel.  They are modified forms of initials with a virama-like hook:

Vowels
Consonants have a default vowel of /a/.
In the table below, '◌' represents a consonant and is used to indicate the position of the various vowels:

In some words, the symbol  is just used for distinguishing homonyms or displaying onomatopoeiae.

Generally, vowels in open syllables (without final) become long whereas ones in closed syllables become short (except  and ).

Tones
Because consonants come in pairs to denote two tonal registers, the two tone marks allow for representation of six specific tones:

Abbreviations
Two letters are used only for abbreviations:
 Syllable  (/lɛʔ˧/, "and", "or") can be abbreviated as the character 
 Syllable  (/lɛu˩/, "already") can be abbreviated as the character

Digits 
New Tai Lue has its own set of digits:

An alternative glyph for one is used when  might be confused with the vowel .

Unicode 

New Tai Lue script was added to the Unicode Standard in March, 2005 with the release of version 4.1.

In June 2015, New Tai Lue was changed from an ISCII-style logical ordering (where vowel modifiers are always encoded after the base consonants which they modify), as used for most Indic scripts in Unicode, to a TIS-620-style visual ordering model (where a vowel modifier will be encoded before the base consonant if it appears before it in the line, or after it otherwise), as used for the Thai and Lao scripts. This change was made since visual ordering for New Tai Lue was found to be more widespread in practice than the previously-prescribed logical ordering. This change affected the four vowel letters which appear to the left of the initial consonant.

The Unicode block for New Tai Lue is U+1980–U+19DF:

See also
 Tai Tham script
 Tai Le script

References

Alphabets
Brahmic scripts
Tai languages